Wu Tianyi or Ismail Sailimujiang (born 25 June 1937) is a Chinese medical scientist best known for research in combatting against altitude sickness and for medical research in the Tibet Autonomous Region. He is of Tajik ethnicity. He is the only Tajik member of the Chinese Academy of Engineering.

Biography
Ismail Sailimujiang was born into an intellectual Tajik family in Yita Circuit, Xinjiang Province, Republic of China (now Taxkorgan Tajik Autonomous County, Xinjiang Uygur Autonomous Region), on 25 June 1935. Later, his family moved to Nanjing, where he got his Han Chinese name "Wu Tianyi". In 1951, he was accepted to the China Medical University (PRC), where he graduated in 1956. In January 1957, he was despatched to the 512 Hospital of People's Volunteer Army with his wife, and worked there until September 1958. Then he went to the PLA 516 Hospital in northwest China's Qinghai province. He was transferred to Xining No.1 People's Hospital and appointed head of the Internal Medicine Department. In January 1979, he became deputy director of Qinghai Plateau Heart Disease Institute, and held that office until February 1983. He joined the Communist Party of China in May 1982. In January 1984, he moved to Qinghai Institute of Plateau Medical Sciences, where he successively served as deputy director, director, and president. In 2019, he was employed as a member of the Academic Department of the Chinese Academy of Medical Sciences.

Personal life
Now all his relatives live in the United States.

Honours and awards
 1987 State Science and Technology Progress Award (Third Class)
 2001 Member of the Chinese Academy of Engineering (CAE)
 2006 Science and Technology Progress Award of the Ho Leung Ho Lee Foundation
 2007 State Science and Technology Progress Award (Second Class)
 2008 7th China Guanghua Engineering Award
 2014 Wu Jieping Medical Award 
 2021 July 1 Medal

References

1937 births
Living people
People from Taxkorgan Tajik Autonomous County
Ethnic Tajik people
China Medical University (PRC) alumni
Chinese military personnel of the Korean War
Members of the Chinese Academy of Engineering